20th Century Masters – The Millennium Collection: The Best of Shai was released on August 14, 2001. The compilation album contains several hit singles of the R&B group.

Track listing

References

Shai
Shai (band) compilation albums
2001 greatest hits albums
MCA Records compilation albums